Al-Harthi is an Arabic surname. Notable people with the surname include:

 Ahmad Al Harthy, Omani racing driver
 Hammoudi Al-Harithi Iraqi actor
 Jokha Alharthi, an Omani writer and academic
 Rabi ibn Ziyad al-Harithi, was an Arab military leader
 Qaed Salim Sinan al-Harethi, was a Yemeni al-Qaeda operative
 Saad Al-Harthi, Saudi footballer
 Abushiri ibn Salim al-Harthi, 19th-century revolutionary

Arabic-language surnames